Events from the year 1663 in Sweden

Incumbents
 Monarch – Charles XI

Events

 The Swedish Collegium medicum is founded to supervise the medical professions. 
 The pirate Gustav Skytte is exposed, trialed and executed.

Births

 August - Amalia Königsmarck, painter, actress and poet (died 1740) 
 unknown - Gävle Boy, notorious witch finder  (died 1676) 
 16 April - Maria Elizabeth of Pfalz-Zweibrücken, princess  (died 1748)

Deaths

 8 March - Hans Christoff von Königsmarck, soldier  (born 1600) 
 Johan Björnsson Printz, governor  (born 1592) 
 Gustav Skytte, pirate (born 1637)

References

 
Years of the 17th century in Sweden
Sweden